Slinky Malinki is a fictitious cat who features in the Hairy Maclary children's stories written by New Zealand author Lynley Dodd.

Slinky Malinki

Slinky Malinki, first published in 1990, is one of a well-known series of books by New Zealand author Lynley Dodd.

The book is written for pre-school children, with rhythmic, rhyming text. It has become a best-selling bedtime storybook in New Zealand.

Malinki is based on Dodd's cat, Wooskit, who was with her for 13 years. Slinky Malinki is very silly.  The Guardian lists Malinki amongst the top ten cats in children's fiction. Original artwork of him has been part of a travelling exhibition over a number of years, and he is part of a sculpture of some of Dodd's characters at Tauranga.

Reception
The book received mixed reviews when first published. School Library Journal found that "While there's nothing wrong with this book, there's nothing to recommend it, either", and concluded "It's hard to imagine many preschoolers who would sit through the whole book. There's just nothing to it." By contrast, a reviewer for Booklist compared Malinki to one of Eliot's cats, highlighted the verse and illustrations, and concluded that "New readers will find the vocabulary varied and occasionally challenging but are sure to enjoy the fun." Multiple editions have been published in the UK and US, as well as Australia and New Zealand, most recently in 2015. A translation into Russian was published in 2011.

It has also been reviewed by Magpies magazine.

It is used in the teaching of language to children.

Slinky Malinki Open The Door
Slinky Malinki Open The Door, first published in 1994, has become a best-selling bedtime storybook in New Zealand. Slinky Malinki has a parrot friend called Stickybeak Syd, and together they open doors in their house and get into mischief.

It has been recommended to educators for the incorporation of instruments during story time.

After the 2000 US presidential election had been described as a 'schmozzle', Dodd's use of the word 'shemozzle' in this book was discussed in US media, with the following verse quoted:

Slinky Malinki Catflaps
First published in 1998.

Slinky Malinki Early Bird 
Slinky Malinki Early Bird, first published in 2012, is written with rhythmic, rhyming text and is popular with pre-school age children. Slinky Malinki wakes the whole family early, and then goes back to sleep, leaving everyone awake and complaining. It has been described as "Slinky Malinki's best caper yet."

It was named a Storylines Notable Book in 2013.

See also

 Scarface Claw, a fictitious tomcat who features in the Hairy Maclary children's stories.

References

External links
Slinky Malinki
Library holdings of Slinky Malinki
Slinky Malinki | RNZ Storytime

1990 children's books
New Zealand children's books
Picture books
Hairy Maclary
Books about cats
Books by Lynley Dodd